Jan Gryfita (first name also spelled Janik or Janisław, ? - 1167 or 1176) was an archbishop of Gniezno (1149 – c. 1167) and bishop of Wrocław (1146 – 1149). Together with his brother Klemens, he was a co-founder of the Cistercian Abbey of Jędrzejów. He was likely the patron and fundator of the Gniezno Doors.

Further reading 
M.L. Wójcik, Ród Gryfitów do końca XIII wieku. Pochodzenie — genealogia — rozsiedlenie, "Historia" CVII, Wrocław 1993

Date of birth unknown
Archbishops of Gniezno
Bishops of Wrocław
12th-century deaths
Janik